This is a list of settlements in Zakynthos, Greece.

 Agalas
 Agia Marina
 Agioi Pantes
 Agios Dimitrios
 Agios Kirykos
 Agios Leontas
 Alikanas
 Ampelokipoi
 Anafonitria
 Ano Gerakari
 Ano Volimes
 Argasi
 Bochali
 Exo Chora
 Fiolitis
 Gaitani
 Galaro
 Gyri
 Kalamaki
 Kalipado
 Kallithea
 Katastari
 Kato Gerakari
 Keri
 Koiliomenos
 Korithi
 Kypseli
 Lagkadakia
 Lagopodo
 Lithakia
 Loucha
 Machairado
 Maries
 Meso Gerakari
 Mouzaki
 Orthonies
 Pantokratoras
 Pigadakia
 Planos
 Romiri
 Sarakinado
 Skoulikado
 Tragaki
 Vanato
 Vasilikos
 Volimes 
 Vougiato
 Zakynthos (city)

See also
List of towns and villages in Greece

 
Zakynthos